= Huang Mien-mien =

Taiwanese politician

Huang Mien-mien (Chinese: 黃綿綿; born c. 1907) was a Taiwanese politician.

Huang was born around 1907, in Yunlin County. He attended Ming Lun High School. A member of the Kuomintang, Huang was elected to the Legislative Yuan in 1972, 1975, and 1980, from the functional constituency representing business.
